The Kenya Plantation and Agricultural Workers Union (KPAWU) is a trade union which represents 200,000 agriculture sector workers (2005 estimate) in Kenya, including tea, coffee, and flower workers. It is a part of the Central Organization of Trade Unions (Kenya). The KPAWU was established in 1963 when several unions were amalgamated. Its head office is in Nakuru, a regional centre. The KPAWU is affiliated to the Central Organization of Trade Unions.

Political activities

The KPAWU is engaged with a number of labour issues. Some of its work is focused on the elimination of child labour in Kenya's agricultural sector. Where plantation owners are seeking Fair Trade certification for their produce, the KPAWU plays a role in the implementation of international labour standards required under the Fair Trade rules.

The KPAWU is opposed to mechanization of plantations on the grounds that the introduction of machines is a threat to jobs. For example, in 2006 it threatened strike action against a plantation owner which sought to introduce tea-picking machines.

KPAWU violates the freedom of association. It has brought lawsuits against another trade union that wants to end KPAWU's monopoly in the floriculture sector.

See also

 Kenyan tea workers strike of 2007

Further reading

1. David Hyde. Plantation Struggles in Kenya: trade unionism on the land, 1945–65. Unpublished Ph.D. thesis, School of Oriental and African Studies, University of London [2000]. This is a detailed historical account of the formative years of the K.P.A.W.U.
  https://1library.net/document/zw16k61q-plantation-struggles-kenya-trade-unionism-land.html

2. David Hyde. Undercurrents to Independence: Plantation Struggles in Kenya's Central Province 1959–60. Journal of Eastern African Studies Volume 4 Issue 3, 2010. This research article gives a detailed historical account of the coffee plantation strikes and the rise of the Coffee Plantation Workers Union in the run up to independence.  
  https://www.researchgate.net/publication/233480320_Undercurrents_to_independence_Plantation_struggles_in_Kenya's_Central_Province_1959-60

3. David Hyde. Decolonisation and 'Development Untoward': Crisis and Conflict on Kenya's Tea Plantations, 1959-60, chapter 8 in 'Workers of the Empire Unite: Radical and Popular Challenges to British Imperialism', [Y.Beliard and N.Kirk eds.] Liverpool University Press, 2021. This account tells the story of workers struggles and the role of the Tea Plantation Workers Union on the colony's tea plantations in western and central Kenya.

References

Agriculture and forestry trade unions
Trade unions in Kenya
Agricultural organisations based in Kenya
Trade unions established in 1963